Ioan Kramer (born 11 March 1962) is a Romanian former football striker.

International career
Ioan Kramer played one friendly match at international level for Romania, in which he scored the decisive goal of the 3–2 victory against Israel.

Honours
FCM Brașov
Divizia B: 1983–84

References

External links

1962 births
Living people
Romanian footballers
Romania international footballers
Association football forwards
Liga I players
Liga II players
2. Bundesliga players
FC Brașov (1936) players
FC Steaua București players
Romanian expatriate footballers
Expatriate footballers in West Germany
Romanian expatriate sportspeople in West Germany
People from Sighișoara